Edward Patrick O'Meara (26 March 1903 – 1 August 1941) was an  Australian rules footballer who played with South Melbourne in the Victorian Football League (VFL).

Family
The son of Cornelius O'Meara (1853-1944),  and Mary O'Meara (1866-1940), née O'Sullivan, Edward Patrick O'Meara was born at Toongabbie, Victoria 26 March 1903.

Football
Recruited from the Leopold Football Club in the Metropolitan Junior Football Association (MJFA).

Death
He died at East Melbourne, Victoria on 1 August 1941.

Notes

References

External links 
 
 
 Edward Patrick O'Meara, at findagrave.com.

1903 births
1941 deaths
Australian rules footballers from Victoria (Australia)
Leopold Football Club (MJFA) players
Sydney Swans players